Eric Volz (born May 19, 1979) is an American entrepreneur, author, and the managing director of The David House Agency, an international crisis resource agency based in Los Angeles. The New York Times recognized Volz as a highly sought crisis manager. He specializes in strategy for international show trials and other complex political and legal situations abroad.
 
After his own high-profile wrongful imprisonment case, Volz formed the David House Agency. He was sentenced to a 30-year prison term in Nicaragua following his wrongful conviction for the November 2006 rape and murder of ex-girlfriend Doris Ivania Jiménez in San Juan del Sur.

An appellate court overturned the conviction on December 17, 2007, and Volz was released from prison four days later. He left Nicaragua immediately and went into hiding in an unknown location because of death threats and over concerns for his physical safety. His experience would become the foundation for his life’s work. In an interview with The New York Times, Volz stated that he named the David House Agency after the biblical “shepherd who slew a giant and knew he was on the right side of the equation.”

Friends and supporters in both countries had insisted on Volz's innocence, claiming that the trial court ignored evidence, and that Volz was the victim of anti-gringo sentiment. Opponents in Nicaragua protested against his release due to what they perceived as special consideration as an American, pressure from the United States government, and accusations that Volz's family bribed the appellate court judges.

Volz’s involvement is visible in some of the highest-profile cases of recent years, including: Matthew and Grace Huang,  Jason Puracal, the ‘American Hikers in Iran’ case, Amir Hekmati, Kenneth Bae and Amanda Knox.

Upon his return to the United States, Eric wrote a memoir about his experience, Gringo Nightmare: A Young American Framed for Murder in Nicaragua. The book was published by St. Martin's Press.

Early life
Volz was born in Northern California and is a former resident of Nashville, Tennessee. He is of Mexican descent and is fluent in Spanish. He received a degree in Latin American Studies from University of California, San Diego. Volz later moved to Managua, Nicaragua, where he launched El Puente ("The Bridge") magazine, advocating for smart growth and ecotourism.

Career
Volz’s international business career started in 2004 when he launched and published a bilingual conscious living and smart tourism magazine called El Puente (EP) in Nicaragua. He went on to establish an investment consulting practice and co-own a Century 21 franchise. After his experience of being wrongfully imprisoned in a foreign country, he authored his memoir Gringo Nightmare: A Young American Framed for Murder in Nicaragua, and became an established professional speaker.

After his conviction was overturned, Volz began to be approached by families of other wrongfully imprisoned individuals seeking guidance on how to navigate similar situations. After several years, what began as pro-bono advice evolved into a private consultancy in 2009. Due to a high volume of cases, Volz founded the David House Agency in 2011.

Referred to as its biggest victory so far, the David House Agency (along with the California Innocence Project) worked on behalf of Matthew and Grace Huang, an American couple of Asian descent from Los Angeles living in Qatar— accused of fatally abusing their adopted daughter who suffered from an eating disorder and other health issues from her deprived upbringing in Ghana.

Volz assembled a defense that included evidence that the prosecution had faked a pathology report on the cause of the girl’s death. Volz's fight for the Huangs included repeated travels to the Middle East and Europe, where he engaged with Qatari government officials. He also pressed American diplomats in Washington and Qatar for their release. The Huangs were declared innocent on November 30, 2014, and in December of that year they returned to the United States.

Volz managed the case of Seattle resident Jason Puracal, who was wrongfully convicted of international drug trafficking and money laundering in Nicaragua and sentenced to 22 years in prison.  Volz’s defense strategy included appearances on CNN’s Anderson Cooper 360  and a ruling from the United Nations Working Group on Arbitrary Detention that Puracal’s detainment was in violation of international law and demanded his immediate release. Puracal’s release was ultimately secured after two years in prison.

Among other famous cases, Volz led the David House Agency’s involvement on the case of the three American hikers who wandered across the Iranian border and were arrested in 2009, and Amir Hekmati, a former U.S. Marine accused of espionage in Iran.  Volz also advised family members of Kenneth Bae, a Korean-American missionary sentenced in 2013 by North Korea to 15 years of hard labor and freed in November 2014, and Amanda Knox.

In October 2014, Volz announced on his Twitter page the launch of the David House Foundation, a nonprofit, non-partisan think tank offering research and analysis on the growing trend of politically motivated detentions of westerners and travelers in foreign countries.  The foundation hosts a niche news channel on its website called ShowTrial News, giving up-to-date information on past and current international wrongful imprisonment cases.

Wrongful Imprisonment

The Murder and the Suspects
On November 21, 2006, Doris Ivania Jiménez, a Nicaraguan who had dated Volz, was murdered at midday in her clothing store Sol Fashion in San Juan del Sur, a Nicaraguan coastal town near Rivas. Volz was arrested and charged with her murder. However, according to both associates and mobile phone records, Volz was at his home in Managua, which also served as the magazine headquarters, conducting meetings and business, including a conference call with contacts in Atlanta, Georgia, in the United States, and telephone and internet logs confirm this. Managua is a two-hour drive from San Juan del Sur.

Police issued warrants for four men.  Two were local San Juan del Sur Nicaraguan surfers, known drug-users and petty criminals, arrested soon after the murder. They were Julio Martín Chamorro López (30), known locally by his nickname "Rosita" and Nelson Antonio López Danglas, (24), known locally as "Krusty."  The third suspect, who was rumored to have been dating Doris Jiménez at the time of her death, was Nicaraguan college student Armando Llanes (20), whose college — Ave Maria College of the Americas, located near Managua — provided him an alibi for part of the time during which the rape and murder had been committed, hence he was never arrested.  The fourth suspect was U.S. citizen Eric Volz, who had dated Jiménez for over year, but the couple had broken up by the summer of 2006.

Chamorro was nabbed after police saw him wandering near Sol Fashion shirtless, bearing what appeared to be fresh scratches and "acting nervous." Danglas was also arrested.  Physical exam records by the police noted that both Chamorro and Danglas bore "scratches on their arms,” and Danglas was scratched “on seven different parts of his body,” including his penis.

In court testimony, a neighbor said that Chamorro had been hanging around Doris Jiménez more frequently prior to the murder, and five days before the event had overheard an angry Chamorro say, "I don't give a damn about this Doris; she's a gringo chaser..." Danglas, despite his fresh injuries, was offered full immunity in exchange for testifying against the American Eric Volz, who had ended a relationship with Doris six months prior. Krusty was released, while Rosita remained in custody, and later appeared as a co-defendant at the trial on February 14, 2007.

The third suspect, Armando Llanes, was never arrested despite the outstanding warrant for his arrest and whose charges were dropped when he produced a statement from his university registrar accounting for his whereabouts during some of the time of when the murder was said to have occurred. The prominent Nicaraguan journalist Camilo de Castro shared the results of his independent investigation during a live television interview, with special emphasis on inconsistencies in Armando Llanes’ alibi and the need for further investigation.

Volz was arrested November 23, 2006, and charged with murder, based on the claims of surfers "Rosita" Chamorro and "Krusty" Danglas, who were both originally charged with the murder, and—per police records—who both bore physical scratches on their bodies, consistent with evidence that Jiménez had scratched her attacker(s).  Later, Rosita admitted to journalist Tony D'Souza that his testimony had been coerced by the police. Volz was arrested despite the fact that ten witnesses and a variety of digital evidence placed Volz two hours away from the crime scene at the time of the murder—at his home in Managua. His home also served as the headquarters for his magazine, where he was conducting meetings and business at the time of the murder. Nelson Danglas (who had received full immunity in exchange for his testimony) was the only person who testified seeing Volz in San Juan del Sur just after the time police believe Doris Jiménez was killed.

The Trial
With Danglas being given full immunity and Llanes never arrested, Chamorro and Volz were left to stand trial as co-defendants.  
Two days before Volz's December 7 arraignment in Rivas, a car with loudspeakers circled through San Juan exhorting people to "bring justice to the gringo!" A huge crowd jeered as he was escorted into the courthouse; during the hearing, a woman outside could be heard shouting, "Come out, gringo, we are going to murder you!"

The murder and trial reportedly cracked open feelings of resentment among Nicaraguans, many of whom believed justice could be bought, saw the killing as a symptom of an invasion of foreigners seeking prime beachfront land. The trial was reportedly “chaotic,” and on at least two occasions the courtroom was surrounded by angry protesters; at one point forcing Volz and a U.S. Embassy security official to flee an angry mob in fear for their lives.

According to Volz's attorneys, Nicaraguan prosecutors did not produce any physical evidence before or at trial. No physical evidence from the crime scene linked Volz to the slaying, and exculpatory evidence was disallowed.
Although ten witnesses supported Volz's alibi and were with him at the time of the murder, the trial court judge, Ivette Toruño Blanco, disallowed the testimony of all of ten claiming their testimony would be redundant and only permitted the testimony of three people who were not with Volz at the time of the murder.

On February 14, 2007, a police officer testified that Rosita Chamorro, claimed that Volz and another foreigner, whom he did not identify, participated in the murder. In her testimony, Mercedes Alvarado, mother of the victim, described Volz as a jealous man whom her daughter believed would kill her because of his jealousy.

Trial Verdict and Controversy

At the conclusion of the three-day trial, Judge Toruño Blanco convicted Volz and sentenced him to 30 years in prison. Friends and supporters in both countries had insisted on Volz's innocence, claiming that the trial court ignored evidence, and that Volz was the victim of anti-gringo sentiment.

Campaign for Release
Volz’s family and friends started the Free Eric Volz campaign asserting Volz’s innocence via social media, including a YouTube documentary entitled “Eric Volz Wrongfully Imprisoned In Nicaragua”, and a website called Friends of Eric Volz . The San Francisco Chronicle identified the campaign as “high-tech and visible”, and was one of the first times the internet and social media had been used to raise awareness about a wrongful imprisonment case. The case received high levels of media attention, both in Spanish and English news markets including a front-page feature in the Wall Street Journal.

Acquittal and Release
Volz spent the next 14 months struggling to stay alive in prison until, on December 17, 2007, he was ordered released after an appeals court overturned the conviction. His passport and bail of $10,000 were never returned: Volz, however, was not immediately freed because a judge failed to show up for an afternoon meeting to arrange his release. Local judge Ivette Toruño Blanco delayed signing the order releasing him. On December 20, 2007, an appeals court in Granada signed release papers for Volz. The prosecutor decided to file a reversal to the appeal in the Nicaraguan supreme court despite the appellate ruling. It was four days before he was actually freed.

Volz's mother appeared on NBC's Today on December 21, 2007, petitioning the Nicaraguan government to release her son. She received support from the White House with a speech from U.S. Secretary of State Condoleezza Rice. The same day, the appeals court signed release papers for Volz, who left Nicaragua on Friday afternoon, said Eddie Vasquez, a spokesman for the U.S. State Department.

Opponents in Nicaragua protested against his release due to what they perceived as special consideration as an American, pressure from the United States government, and accusations that Volz's family bribed the appellate court judges.

Volz left Nicaragua immediately and went into hiding in an unknown location outside Nicaragua because of death threats and over concerns for his physical safety.

Political Undertones
Amidst the political backdrop of this case, former Communist leader Daniel Ortega had ascended back to power in Nicaragua just weeks after Doris Jiménez's death. An unnamed senior US State Department official commented to media that the US ambassador to Nicaragua had spoken to officials up to and including President Daniel Ortega, to push the case along.

That same official noted that although it was viewed as being in the Ortega government’s best interest to implement the court’s decision to overturn Volz’s conviction, there was concern that the Nicaraguan government did not want to be perceived as caving to international pressure 

The Sandinista National Liberation Front governments chief prosecutor, Julio Centeno, referred to Volz's liberation as a "barbarity", a view echoed by the Sandinista’s current Director of Human Rights Omar Cabezas.

The New York Times reported that the case “proved not who killed Ms Jimenez, but that justice in Nicaragua is a nebulous concept, subjective to the point of abstraction.”  The outlet also reported that “Those who are certain that Mr. Volz killed Ms. Jimenez and those equally insistent that he did not agree on one thing:  the case has laid bare the deficiencies in Nicaraguan justice”.

International Lawsuit: Volz v. Nicaragua 
On November 17, 2008, Volz announced via a YouTube video that the Nicaraguan government had reopened its case against him after 11 months. In response, Volz filed a 700-page petition, Volz v. Nicaragua, to the Inter-American Commission on Human Rights of the Organization of American States (OAS) in 2009. The Commission’s response is still pending. Volz’s lawyers argued that retrying an acquitted person violates Nicaragua's constitution and they claimed political motivation, specifically anti-American sentiment, for this action.

Memoir 
In May 2010, St. Martin’s Press published a memoir by Volz entitled Gringo Nightmare. The book was edited by Charlie Spicer, who USA Today calls, "publishing's most savvy true-crime editor". A paperback edition was published a year later in May 2011.

The book launched with a first of its kind online "Exhibit Hall" that allows readers to review actual case materials such as: photographs and video from inside prisons, headshots of main characters, audio tapes from trial, autopsy reports, government documents, witness statements, crime scene photos, original police case file, defense motions, court rulings, and newspaper articles. The book's foreword was written by investigative journalist Bill Kurtis host of A&E Network's Investigative Reports, American Justice, and Cold Case Files. Bill Kurtis stated, "This story should be issued with every passport.”

The book received praise after its release. Publishers Weekly said “There is much pain in Volz's memoir of being a young American in a near-perfect frame-up involving murder, tabloid headlines, police corruption, and political power plays in Nicaragua.” Outside Magazine said, “Volz walks us through his ordeal in clear, engaging prose, focusing on the trial and the challenges of daily life in rank Central American prisons.

References

External links
 David House Agency
 Friends of Eric Volz
 Outside magazine feature story – June 2007
 News and Observer – May 10, 2007
 Washington Post – May 7, 2007
 NPR: Family – April 29, 2007
 Dateline NBC report on the case
 Gringo Nightmare: A Young American Framed for Murder in Nicaragua
Macmillan Speakers Bureau profile
https://web.archive.org/web/20120516084157/http://www.mensjournal.com/eric-volz Eric Volz: A Season in Hell - June 1, 2007

1979 births
Living people
American expatriates in Nicaragua
American magazine publishers (people)
American people of Mexican descent
People from Nashville, Tennessee
University of California, San Diego alumni
American people imprisoned abroad
Prisoners and detainees of Nicaragua
Overturned convictions